The American Species Survival Plan or SSP program was developed in 1981 by the (American) Association of Zoos and Aquariums to help ensure the survival of selected species in zoos and aquariums, most of which are threatened or endangered in the wild.

SSP program
SSP programs focus on animals that are near threatened, threatened, endangered, or otherwise in danger of extinction in the wild, when zoo and zoology conservationists believe captive breeding programs will aid in their chances of survival.  These programs help maintain healthy and genetically diverse animal populations within the Association of Zoos and Aquariums-accredited zoo community. AZA accredited zoos and AZA conservation partners that are involved in SSP programs engage in cooperative population management and conservation efforts that include research, conservation genetics, public education, reintroduction, and in situ or field conservation projects. There are currently 172 species covered by 116 SSP programs throughout North America. The SSP has been met with widespread success in ensuring that, should a species population become functionally extinct in its natural habitat, a viable population still exists within a zoological setting. This has also led to AZA species reintroduction programs, examples of which include the black-footed ferret, the California condor, the northern riffleshell, the golden lion tamarin, the Karner blue butterfly, the Oregon spotted frog, the palila finch, the red wolf, and the Wyoming toad.

SSP master plan
An SSP master plan is a document produced by the SSP coordinator (generally a zoo professional under the guidance of an elected management committee) for a certain species.  This document sets ex situ population goals and other management recommendations to achieve the maximum genetic diversity and demographic stability for a species, given transfer and space constraints.

See also
 European Endangered Species Programme

List of SSP programs
There are currently 478 species and subspecies that have an SSP program.
Aardvark
Addax
Agouti, Brazilian
Alligator, Chinese
Anteater, giant
Antelope, roan
Antelope, sable
Aracari, curl-crested
Aracari, green
Argus, great
Armadillo, screaming
Armadillo, six-banded
Armadillo, southern three-banded
Ass, Somali wild
Aye-aye
Baboon, Hamadryas
Barasingha
Barbet, bearded
Barbet, red-and-yellow
Bat, Egyptian fruit
Bat, Rodrigues fruit
Bat, straw-colored fruit
Bear, Andean spectacled
Bear, polar
Bear, sloth
Beaver, American
Beetle, American burying
Bettong, brush-tailed
Binturong
Bird-of-paradise
Bird-of-paradise, superb
Bluebird, fairy
Boa, Jamaican
Bongo, eastern
Bonobo
Bontebok
Bulbul, collared finchbill
Bushbaby, Mohol
Bushmaster, South American
Cacique, yellow-rumped
Callimico
Capuchin, brown
Capuchin, crested
Capuchin, white-throated
Capybara
Cardinal, red-capped
Cardinal, red-crested
Cassowary, Southern (double-wattled)
Cat, black-footed
Cat, fishing
Cat, Pallas
Cat, sand
Chat, snowy-crowned robin
Cheetah
Chevrotain, greater Malayan
Chicken, Attwater's prairie
Chimpanzee
Chuckwalla, San Esteban
Cichlid, Lake Victoria - Argens
Cichlid, Lake Victoria - Degeni
Cichlid, Lake Victoria - Esculentus
Cichlid, Lake Victoria - Lip, two-stripe white
Cichlid, Lake Victoria - Melanopterus
Cichlid, Lake Victoria - Perrieri
Cichlid, Lake Victoria - Piceatus
Coatimundi, white-nosed
Cobra, king
Cockatoo, palm
Colobus, Angolan
Colobus, guereza
Condor, Andean
Condor, California
Conure, golden
Coua, crested
Crane, black crowned
Crane, Demoiselle
Crane, grey crowned
Crane, red crowned
Crane, wattled
Crane, white-naped
Crane, whooping
Crocodile, Cuban
Crocodile, Orinoco
Crocodile, Siamese
Crocodile, slender-snouted
Curassow, blue-billed
Curassow, helmeted
Curassow, wattled
Cuttlefish, flamboyant
Deer, Eld's
Deer, Père David's
Deer, western tufted
Dikkop, spotted
Dog, African painted
Dove, beautiful fruit
Dove, black-naped fruit
Dove, grey-capped emerald
Dove, jambu fruit
Dove, luzon bleeding heart
Dove, Mariana fruit
Dove, Mindanao bleeding heart
Dove, pink-necked (Temminck's) fruit
Dove, white-throated ground
Dragon, Komodo
Duck, spotted whistling
Duck, West Indian whistling
Duck, white-winged wood
Duiker, blue
Duiker, red-flanked
Duiker, yellow-backed
Echidna, short-beaked
Eland, common
Elephant, African
Elephant, Asian
Falcon, African pygmy
Ferret, black-footed
Flamingo, Caribbean
Flamingo, Chilean
Flamingo, greater
Flamingo, lesser
Flying fox, Indian
Flying fox, island
Flying fox, large
Fossa
Fox, bat-eared
Fox, fennec
Fox, swift
Frog, dusky gopher
Frog, Panamanian golden (ahogado)
Frog, Panamanian golden (marta)
Frog, Panamanian Golden (sora)
Frogmouth, tawny
Galago, northern greater
Galliwasp, Hispaniolan giant
Gazelle, addra
Gazelle, Nubian Soemmerring's
Gazelle, slender-horned
Gazelle, Speke's
Gazelle, Thomson's
Gecko, giant leaf-tailed
Gecko, Henkel's leaf-tailed
Gecko, mossy leaf-tailed
Gecko, satanic leaf-tailed
Gemsbok
Gerenuk, southern
Gharial, Indian
Gharial, sunda
Gibbon, lar (white-handed)
Gibbon, white-cheeked
Giraffe, generic
Giraffe, Masai
Goose, African pygmy
Goose, Indian pygmy
Goose, nene
Goose, Orinoco
Goose, red-breasted
Goose, swan
Goral, Chinese
Gorilla, western
Guineafowl, crested
Guitarfish, bowmouth
Hamerkop
Heron, boat-billed
Hippopotamus, pygmy
Hippopotamus, river
Hog, red river
Honeyeater, blue-faced
Hornbill, Abyssinian ground
Hornbill, great
Hornbill, red-billed
Hornbill, rhinoceros
Hornbill, southern ground
Hornbill, trumpeter
Hornbill, wrinkled
Horse, Asian wild
Hwamei, Chinese
Hyena, spotted
Hyrax, rock
Ibex, Nubian
Ibis, African sacred
Ibis, hadada
Ibis, Madagascar crested
Ibis, scarlet
Ibis, southern bald (cape)
Ibis, straw-necked
Ibis, waldrapp
Iguana, Fiji banded
Iguana, Grand Cayman blue
Iguana, Jamaican
Impala
Jaguar
Jay, plush-crested
Kangaroo, eastern gray
Kangaroo, red
Kangaroo, western gray
Kea
Kingfisher, Guam
Kinkajou
Kiwi, North Island brown
Klipspringer
Koala, Queensland
Kookaburra, laughing
Kudu, greater
Kudu, lesser
Langur, Francois'
Langur, silvered leaf
Lapwing, masked
Lapwing, spur-winged
Laughingthrush, white-crested
Lechwe, Nile
Leiothrix, red-billed
Lemur, black-and-white ruffed
Lemur, blue-eyed black
Lemur, collared
Lemur, crowned
Lemur, gray mouse
Lemur, mongoose
Lemur, red ruffed
Lemur, ring-tailed
Leopard, clouded
Leopard, snow
Liocichla, scarlet-faced
Lion
Lizard, Caiman
Lizard, Chinese crocodile
Lizard, Rio Fuerte beaded
Loris, pygmy slow
Lynx, Canada
Macaque, Japanese
Macaw, blue-throated
Macaw, hyacinth
Macaw, red-fronted
Magpie, azure-winged
Magpie, red-billed blue
Mandrill
Mangabey, black
Mara, Patagonian
Markhor, Turkmenian
Marmoset, Geoffroy's
Marmoset, pygmy
Meerkat
Merganser, scaly-sided
Mongoose, banded
Mongoose, dwarf
Monitor, black tree
Monitor, crocodile
Monkey, Allen's swamp
Monkey, Bolivian gray titi
Monkey, Central American spider
Monkey, common squirrel
Monkey, DeBrazza's
Monkey, diana
Monkey, Mexican spider
Monkey, patas
Monkey, robust black spider
Monkey, Schmidt's red-tailed
Monkey, southern black howler
Motmot, blue-crowned
Mouse, Perdido Key beach
Muntjac, Reeves'
Murre, common
Myna, Bali
Mynah, golden-crested
Nyala, lowland
Ocelot
Okapi
Onager, Persian
Orangutan, Bornean
Orangutan, Sumatran
Oropendola, crested
Oryx, Arabian
Oryx, scimitar-horned
Otter, Asian small-clawed
Otter, giant
Otter, North American river
Otter, sea (northern spp.)
Otter, sea (southern spp.)
Otter, spotted-necked
Owl, burrowing
Owl, Eurasian eagle
Owl, snowy
Owl, spectacled
Owl, Verreaux's eagle
Panda, giant
Panda, red (fulgens)
Panda, red (refulgens)
Parrot, hawk-weaded
Parrot, thick-billed
Partridge, crested wood
Peafowl, Congo
Peccary, Chacoan
Pelican, Dalmatian
Pelican, great white
Pelican, pink-backed
Penguin, African
Penguin, chinstrap
Penguin, gentoo (ellsworthi)
Penguin, gentoo (papua)
Penguin, Humboldt
Penguin, king
Penguin, little blue
Penguin, macaroni
Penguin, Magellanic
Penguin, southern rockhopper
Pheasant, Palawan peacock
Pheasant, Vietnam
Pig, Visayan warty
Pigeon, green-naped pheasant
Pigeon, nicobar
Pigeon, Victoria crowned
Pigeon, western (blue) crowned
Pitta, hooded
Pochard, Baer's
Porcupine, cape and crested
Porcupine, North American
Porcupine, prehensile-tailed
Pronghorn, peninsular
Pudu, Chilean
Puffin, Atlantic
Puffin, horned
Puffin, tufted
Rattlesnake, Aruba Island
Rattlesnake, Eastern Massasauga
Rattlesnake, Mexican lance-headed
Rattlesnake, Santa Catalina Island
Ray, spotted eagle
Rhinoceros, eastern black
Rhinoceros, greater one-horned
Rhinoceros, southern white
Ringtail
Roadrunner, greater
Roller, blue-bellied
Saki, white-faced
Sawfish, largetooth
Sawfish, longcomb
Sawfish, smalltooth
Screamer, southern
Sea lion, California
Sea eagle, Steller's
Seahorse, big-bellied
Seahorse, lined
Seal, grey
Seal, harbor
Secretarybird
Seriema, red-legged
Serval
Shama, white-rumped
Shark, blacktip reef
Shark, sand tiger
Shark, zebra
Sheep, desert bighorn
Siamang
Sifaka, Coquerel's
Sitatunga
Skink, prehensile-tailed
Sloth, Hoffman's two-toed
Sloth, Linne's two-toed
Snail, partula
Snake, eastern indigo
Snake, Louisiana pine
Spider, gooty sapphire ornamental
Spoonbill, African
Spoonbill, roseate
Springbok, South African
Squirrel, Prevost's
Starling, emerald
Starling, golden-breasted
Starling, grosbeak
Starling, violet-backed (amethyst)
Stilt, black-necked
Stingray, bigtooth river
Stingray, ocellated river
Stingray, Tiger River
Stingray, white-blotched river
Stork, Abdim's (white-bellied)
Stork, marabou
Stork, milky
Stork, saddle-billed
Stork, white
Stork, yellow-billed
Sunbittern
Swan, coscoroba
Swan, trumpeter
Takin, Sichuan
Tamandua, southern
Tamarin, bearded emperor
Tamarin, cotton-top
Tamarin, golden lion
Tamarin, golden-headed lion
Tamarin, pied
Tanager, blue-grey
Tanager, silver-beaked
Tanager, turquoise
Tapir, Baird's (Central American)
Tapir, Malayan (Asian)
Teal, marbled
Teal, Madagascar
Tenrec, lesser Madagascar hedgehog
Tern, Inca
Terrapin, painted
Thrush, chestnut-backed
Tiger, Amur
Tiger
Tiger, Malayan
Tiger, Sumatran
Tinamou, elegant crested
Toad, Houston
Toad, Wyoming
Tortoise, African pancake
Tortoise, brown forest
Tortoise, Burmese black
Tortoise, Burmese star
Tortoise, Egyptian
Tortoise, Forsten's
Tortoise, Galapagos (microphyes)
Tortoise, Galapagos (porteri)
Tortoise, Galapagos (vicina)
Tortoise, Home's hinge-back
Tortoise, Madagascar flat-tailed
Tortoise, Madagascar spider (common)
Tortoise, Madagascar spider (northern)
Tortoise, Madagascar spider (southern)
Tortoise, radiated
Toucan, keel-billed
Toucan, Toco
Tragopan, Cabot's
Tree kangaroo, Matschie's
Tree shrew, northern
Troupial
Turaco, great blue
Turaco, Lady Ross'
Turaco, red-crested
Turaco, violaceous
Turaco, white-cheeked
Turtle, Arakan forest
Turtle, black-breasted leaf
Turtle, Blanding's
Turtle, bog
Turtle, Coahuilan box
Turtle, four-eyed
Turtle, Indochinese box
Turtle, keeled box
Turtle, Malaysian giant
Turtle, McCord's box
Turtle, Northwestern pond
Turtle, Pan's box
Turtle, Rote Island snake-necked
Turtle, southwestern pond
Turtle, spiny
Turtle, spotted
Turtle, Sulawesi forest
Turtle, Vietnamese pond
Turtle, wood
Turtle, yellow-blotched map
Turtle, yellow-headed temple
Urial, Transcaspian
Vulture, African white-backed
Vulture, cape
Vulture, Eurasian black
Vulture, hooded
Vulture, king
Vulture, lappet-faced
Vulture, Ruppell's griffon
Wallaby, Bennett's
Wallaby, tammar
Wallaroo, common
Warthog, common
Waterbuck, common
Weaver, white-headed buffalo
Whale, beluga
Wildebeest
Wolf, maned
Wolf, Mexican gray
Wolf, red
Wood hoopoe, green
Zebra, Grevy's
Zebra, Hartmann's mountain
Zebra, plains

Notes

References

External links
AZA website

Animal breeding organizations
Wildlife conservation
Zoology
Zoos